Royal Air Force Cottam or more simply RAF Cottam is a former Royal Air Force satellite airfield near Cottam in the East Riding of Yorkshire, England and  north west of Driffield, East Riding of Yorkshire. The airfield was used only occasionally for flying, mostly being utilised as a bomb storage site.

History

Despite being built as a bomber airfield as a satellite to RAF Driffield, poor weather conditions meant it was never used as its intended use as operational airfield, though some flying did occur. The airfield was used temporarily as a dispersal site in August 1940 after a devastating raid on RAF Driffield. An attack by up to 30 Ju 88's saw 169 bombs dropped, 13 personnel killed, 12 Whitley bombers destroyed, and as a result of the raid, Driffield was non-operational for the rest of 1940. Cottam's watch office was demolished in 1980. The airfield operated until June 1954.

The airfield was then used by RAF Maintenance Command as No. 91 Maintenance Unit RAF (MU) used the runways and buildings for bomb storage, until the 1950s. In December 1944, the station was listed as having 1,057 and 188 women from Maintenance Command and No. 42 Group billeted there.

Current use

The airfield is currently farmland with little remaining buildings spread over the entire site and the dispersed areas, however the traces of the runways and dispersals can be seen from the air. Ordnance Survey mapping from 1982 shows that the main north east/south west runway had been removed by that time.

RAF Cottam has a unique claim to fame as the 'virtual' airfield for RAF Air Traffic Controller as well as Flight Operations simulator training at RAF Shawbury.

Units

References

Sources

External links
Airfield Information Exchange
Driffield Online

Royal Air Force stations in Yorkshire
Royal Air Force stations of World War II in the United Kingdom
Transport in the East Riding of Yorkshire